The canton of Montmarault is a former administrative division in central France. It was disbanded following the French canton reorganisation which came into effect in March 2015. It had 7,991 inhabitants (2012).

The canton comprised the following communes:

Beaune-d'Allier
Bézenet
Blomard
Chappes
Chavenon 
Doyet
Louroux-de-Beaune
Montmarault
Montvicq
Murat
Saint-Bonnet-de-Four
Saint-Marcel-en-Murat
Saint-Priest-en-Murat
Sazeret
Vernusse
Villefranche-d'Allier

Demographics

See also
Cantons of the Allier department

References

Former cantons of Allier
2015 disestablishments in France
States and territories disestablished in 2015